The Tyson Zone is a phrase coined by sports writer Bill Simmons (although the idea came from one of his readers), to describe the point at which a celebrity's behavior becomes so unpredictable, that there is nothing they could do that would shock or surprise you, as well as the general public. The phrase is nicknamed after boxer Mike Tyson due to his bizarre public antics, both inside and outside of the ring.

History 

The phrase originated in a 2004 ESPN mailbag blog by Bill Simmons with an email from a reader named Brendan from Philadelphia asking "I think Ron Artest has entered rarified air now. He's officially a person who, if a friend said, "Did you hear that (fill in celebrity's name) just (fill in the insane behavior: urinated on a police officer, began breeding unicorns, etc.)?", I would have no problem believing it was true. I think this space is occupied by Mike Tyson, Michael Jackson, Courtney Love, and the late, great ODB. Can you think of any others?" In his response to this question, Simmons would dub this theory the "Tyson Zone" after Mike Tyson.

Examples 
Many different individuals and even a sports team have been cited as being in the Tyson Zone, a selection of those described as being in the Tyson Zone are listed below.

 Ron Artest
 The Cleveland Browns football team
 Gary Busey
 Tom Cruise
 Flava Flav
 Michael Jackson
 Courtney Love
 Dennis Rodman
 Rip Torn
 Donald Trump
 Mike Tyson
 Kanye West
 Aaron Rodgers

References 

English phrases